Walter Hugo Khouri (São Paulo, 21 October 1929 – São Paulo, 27 June 2003) was a Brazilian film director, screenwriter, and producer of Lebanese and Italian descent. 

Khouri made 25 feature films and won several national and international awards. His 1964 film Empty Night is considered one of the best Brazilian films of all time and was entered for the Palm d'Or in the 1965 Cannes Film Festival.

His films show characters, mostly male, who seek meaning for a distressing existence. He was also known for welcoming and introducing young professionals, being the first director to cast the presenter Xuxa Meneghel in the controversial 1982 film Love Strange Love.

Filmography
 2001 –  The Beasts  (filmed in 1998)
 1999 –  Lost Passion 
 1991 –  Forever
 1987 –  Monica and the Mermaid of Rio 
 1986 –  I
 1984 –  Voracious Love 
 1982 –  Love Strange Love
 1981 –  Eros, the God of Love 
 1980 –  Invitation to Pleasure 
 1979 –  The Sex Prisoner 
 1978 –  The Daughters of Fire 
 1977 –  Passion and Shadows 
 1975 –  The Desire 
 1974 –  The Angel of the Night 
 1973 –  The Last Rapture 
 1972 –  The Goddesses
 1970 –  The Palace of Angels
 1970 –  Pindorama (produced)
 1968 –  The Amorous Ones
 1967 –  Burning Body
 1966 –  The Cariocas
 1964 –  Men and Women
 1962 –  The Island 
 1959 –  In the Throat of the Devil
 1959 –  Borders of Hell 
 1958 –  Strange Encounter 
 1953 –  The Stone Giant

References

External links

1929 births
2003 deaths
Brazilian film directors
Brazilian film producers
Brazilian people of Lebanese descent
Businesspeople from São Paulo